Datuk Robert Tawik (born 1 September 1961) is a Malaysian politician who is serving as the State Assistant Minister. He has served as the Member of Sabah State Legislative Assembly (MLA) for Bingkor since May 2018. He is a member of the Homeland Solidarity Party (STAR) which is aligned with the ruling Perikatan Nasional (PN) coalition both in federal and state levels.

Honours
  :
  Commander of the Order of Kinabalu (PGDK) – Datuk (2020)

Election results

References

Members of the Sabah State Legislative Assembly
Kadazan-Dusun people
Malaysian Muslims
Homeland Solidarity Party politicians
Living people
1961 births